Convención is a Colombian municipality located in the department of North Santander.It is considered as the largest producer of panela in the department. Account, according to figures estimated by the DANE, with a population of 16,605 inhabitants. It is located at 1,076 meters above sea level and its climate is temperate

History
The first conqueror to set foot in these territories was the German Ambrosio Alfinger in 1530, who perished in combat with the aborigines. Later, Spaniards Pedro de Ursua and Ortón Velázquez founded many settlements in what is now Norte de Santander.

References

 Convención official website

Municipalities of the Norte de Santander Department